

Company History and Services 
Magellan Data and Mapping Strategies, now called Magellan Strategies, is a survey research, data mining and campaign consulting firm located in Louisville, Colorado.  The company's clients include Republican Party candidates, conservative political organizations, non-profit organizations, trade associations, businesses and local governments. The firm was founded in November 2006. Using quantitative and qualitative survey research methods, the firm helps Republican candidates, conservative organizations, trade associations and governments better understand voter opinion. In addition to survey research, the company provides predictive voter modeling, voter data analysis and campaign consulting services. Magellan is a member of the Marketing Research Association, the American Association for Public Opinion Research, and the American Association of Political Consultants. Some of the firm's clients include the Republican National Committee and Americans for Prosperity.

Survey Weighting Methodology
Magellan Strategies maintains and uses a national database of registered voters to determine their survey sampling weights by gender, age group, party registration and race.  The firm does take into account past exit polling for a state or district when determining final survey weighting, but the principals of the firm consider exit polling data secondary and much less accurate than aggregated vote history from a complete and accurate voter registration database with solid vote history.

Public Polling & Media References

2017 References 
 Magellan Strategies was referenced in a Vail Daily article regarding survey research into support for public housing. 
 Magellan Strategies was referenced in a Colorado Independent article regarding why Donald Trump lost Colorado.

2016 Election Cycle 
 Magellan Strategies staff was interviewed about the 2016 election in Colorado by FOX 31 Denver.  
 Magellan Strategies data on Colorado millennial voters was referenced in an article in the Colorado Springs Gazette.  
 Magellan Strategies Colorado surveys were referenced regarding Amendment 71 in a Colorado Independent article. 
 Magellan Strategies Colorado early voting report is referenced in a U.S. News & World Report article about millennial voters.
 Magellan Strategies staff was interviewed by Megan Verlee of Colorado Public Radio regarding Colorado mail ballot returns.
 Magellan Strategies Colorado mail ballot return reports are cited in an article in the Los Angeles Times about early voting.
 Magellan Strategies survey of likely 2016 voters in Colorado regarding ColoradoCare and Amendment 69 was referenced in The Wall Street Journal.
 Magellan Strategies Staff is interviewed by The New York Times for an article regarding 2016 election and state legislative races.
 Magellan Strategies staff is interviewed by the Summit Daily newspaper regarding Colorado voter registration and voter turnout trends.
 Magellan Strategies survey is referenced in Denver 9News Congressional Debate, regarding 59% of Donald Trump supporters not voting for Republicans that do not support Donald Trump.
 Magellan Strategies survey of likely Colorado voters is referenced in a Denver Post article regarding Republican US Senate candidate Darryl Glenn.
 Magellan Strategies staff is referenced in a Denver Post article regarding Donald Trump and women voters.
 Magellan Strategies staff appeared on the PBS Newshour with Gwen Ifill to provide commentary of the 2016 Presidential election in Colorado.
 Magellan Strategies survey of likely Colorado voters was referenced by the Denver Post regarding the findings for Amendment 70 to increase the minimum wage and Proposition 107 to bring back a Presidential primary.
 Magellan Strategies staff is interviewed by Lance Hernandez of Denver ABC News affiliate discussing the Iowa Republican presidential caucus and why Colorado will not get a lot of attention from the candidates.
 Magellan Strategies staff is quoted in a Politico article regarding the 2016 Presidential election in Pennsylvania.
 Magellan Strategies staff is interviewed by Colorado Public Radio regarding the growth of Libertarian and Green Party registration in Colorado.
 Magellan Strategies survey of likely Colorado voters was referenced by Townhall.com. 
 Magellan Strategies survey of likely Colorado voters was referenced by Pueblo/Colorado Springs NBC affiliate KOAA.
 Magellan Strategies survey of likely Colorado voters was referenced by the Colorado Business Journal regarding Amendment 69 and other Colorado ballot measures.

2015 Colorado Legislative Session 
Magellan Strategies staff testifies in front of Colorado Senate Transportation Committee regarding Colorado voter opinion of a proposed 3.5 billion dollar bond measure to fund transportation need in the state.

2012 Election Cycle
In mid-November 2011, a Magellan poll conducted for the New Hampshire Journal surprisingly reported that Newt Gingrich had surged in New Hampshire, which hosts the first Presidential nominating primary. Former Massachusetts Governor Mitt Romney had long led polls in New Hampshire, yet the Magellan Poll seemingly revealed he had lost a quarter of his support. The Magellan Poll reported that Romney had 29% of the support of surveyed voters while Gingrich was in a virtual statistical tie with 27%. By contrast, a Bloomberg News poll conducted less than a week before the Magellan Poll put Romney's support in New Hampshire at 40% and Gingrich at 11%. A story in The New York Times on December 16 reported "Signs of trouble emerged for Mr. Romney in New Hampshire on Nov. 18, the day a poll in The New Hampshire Journal showed for the first time that Mr. Romney and Mr. Gingrich were essentially tied, defying months of data that had suggested Mr. Romney’s lead in the state was unassailable. His aides, who had considered the state a political firewall, were suddenly spooked, said two people who have advised the campaign. The campaign dug into the numbers, and found what they considered flaws, but also unmistakable evidence of an ascent by Mr. Gingrich. A person who has advised Mr. Romney in the past said, "That rattled them".

2011 Election Cycle 
The Political editor of the Denver Post acknowledges Magellan Strategies for correctly predicting the outcome of the special election in New York's 9th Congressional District to replace Anthony Weiner.

2010 Election Cycle 
Magellan was criticized for making an inaccurate prediction that Tom Tancredo would win the 2010 Colorado Governors Election. 2010 gubernatorial election in Colorado.  Tom Tancredo lost to Democrat John Hickenlooper on election day, November 2. Hickenlooper resoundingly beat Tancredo by a margin of 51% to 36%. Editorial page editor Curtis Hubbard of The Denver Post gave Magellan his "Agony of Defeat" award for the worst poll in the gubernatorial race.

References

External links

Magellan Data and Mapping Strategies